Tiger Island is a wildlife attraction at the Dreamworld amusement park on the Gold Coast, Queensland, Australia. In April 2019, the area was home to eight adult tigers and three cubs. This exhibit is home to both the Bengal and Sumatran tiger species.

The exhibit also has events with the trainers and tigers. Normally, trainers get the tigers to do jumps and other simple tricks to entertain the audience.

History
Tiger Island opened in 1995 as one of only two interactive tiger exhibits in the world. The exhibit featured various locations for the tigers to live, swim and play. Just three years later, in October 1998, Dreamworld welcomed their first litter of four Bengal tiger cubs consisting of Rama, Sita, Sultan and Taj. In 2006, the first litter of Sumatran tiger cubs was born featuring Indah and Rahni. A nursery and smaller tiger enclosure were constructed to showcase the younger tigers before being released into the main exhibit.

On 20 June 2012, Mohan, one of Dreamworld's original Bengal tigers died after a battle with kidney disease. Mohan was born on 2 November 1994 in the United States before being transferred to Dreamworld for the opening of Tiger Island.

In 2015, two litters were born to Raja (father) and Nika (mother). On 25 July, Kai, a male cub, was born, while two female cubs were born on 29 November, to the same mother and father. Later during a competition done in conjunction with Channel 7's Sunrise Morning Show, the two female cubs were named Akasha and Adira.

On 19 February 2016, two white tiger cubs were put on public display in a temporary quarantine enclosure, found in Ocean Parade, in front of Zombie Evilution. These two cubs, who were later to be named Kiko and Kali, were flown in from Japan under Dreamworld's partnership arrangement with Hirakawa Zoo in Kagoshima City.

On 29 February 2016, the Tiger Island area closed for refurbishment. It re-opened on Sunday, 18 September 2016 with designs by Jamie Durie.

Tigers

Former tigers
This section shows a list of tigers that were present at the park, but are no longer there.

Tiger presentations

Tiger presentations are performed twice daily in the main exhibit. Guests can watch as the tigers perform many natural behaviours which showcase their agility. Throughout the presentation the tigers climb  trees and jump up to  into the air. In 2013, Cub College will feature some of the younger tigers performing in the presentation.

Dreamworld Wildlife Foundation

Since 1997, Dreamworld has run the Dreamworld Tiger Fund which aims to support various projects that help save tigers in the wild. The fund has contributed over a million dollars to this cause in the past 15 years. The fund relies on a percentage of profits from merchandise sales, tiger walks and tiger photos as well as donations from the Dreamworld's guests and the wider community.

In March 2012, the DWF was established, collaborating with existing wildlife conservation groups to bring substantial financial support to the conservation movement on a global scale.

An internationally recognized fund committed to the protection, education, and conservation of the earth's most magnificent creatures and habitats, crucial to their survival. Through this initiative, you are able to adopt some of the species of animals found in the Dreamworld Corroboree, such as Tasmanian devils, crocodiles, red kangaroos, and cassowaries, alongside the Tiger Island tigers.

Shopping and dining
Overlooking the tiger exhibit exists a merchandise and a dining outlet. Guests can purchase tiger merchandise at Tiger Bazaar and buy food and beverage items at the Island Noodle Hut.

See also
 The Lair, an adjacent exotic animal exhibit at Dreamworld
 Dreamworld Corroboree, the Australian wildlife exhibit found at the park

References

Themed areas in Dreamworld (Australia)
Dreamworld (Australia)
Amusement rides introduced in 1995
1995 establishments in Australia